The African Times USA is an American Pan-African magazine published biweekly and quarterly, with a focus on Africa and the Pan-African world.

History and Profile 
The African Times USA was founded by Charles Anyiam in 1989. As a media company with a pan-African mandate, The African Times USA is committed to powering African renaissance through delivery news, insights, reports, perspectives and analysis that concerns and affects different pan-African audience. Categories published by The African Times USA include pan-African thoughts, politics, history, economy, lifestyle and travel and tourism as well as how Africa and black people influences the rest of the World. The African Times USA is widely read in different countries in Africa, the Diaspora communities in USA, Europe and pan-African nations around the world.

In April 2020, the African Times-USA commenced a weekly digital publication – www.theafricantimes.com – on an integrated website portal which includes an e-commerce component.

Expansion 
The African Times-USA plans to expand its periodical, Africa Quarterly, which will be published in print to accommodate certain subjects that will need to be dealt with in-depth. New features are planned in the digital versions aimed at addressing certain topics to certain demography.

Travel and Tourism 
As a honorary envoy to a few island nations and board member of Southern California Chapter of The Africa Travel Association (ATA), Charles, the founder of The African Times USA has ensured that travel and tourism category is a major segment of The African Times USA. For over 30 years, The African Times USA has been promoting the tourism and hospitality industry in Africa and the rest of the Pan-African World through its publications. In 2022, they introduced a media campaign under the hashtags - #VisitAfrica, #TravelTuesday and #TravelThursday to further promote pan-African tourism.

Awards Event 
In 1991, The African Times USA started and organized the Africa Achievement Awards hosted at the Beverly Hills Hotel in Beverly Hills, California. Since then, it has honored a handful of notable individuals and organizations. These include Presidents Bill Clinton, Nelson Mandela, Olusegun Aremu Obasanjo and Abdoulaye Wade. Other awardees include Stevie Wonder, National Geographic, Nollywood and Ethiopian Airlines.

Myth 
The African Times USA is thought to serve only the African-American audience because it is based in California. On the contrary, it serves the global pan-African demography. Its readers base are not just in the United States of America. It is read widely by people in Africa and the Caribbean; the Afro-Latina, the Afro-Portuguese, the Afro-European and wherever people of African descent are found.

References 

Newspapers published in the United States
American news websites
Pan-Africanism in the United States